Stan Kenton Classics is an album by pianist and bandleader Stan Kenton compiling performances recorded between 1945 and 1947 and originally collected on the Capitol label as a 10-inch LP in 1950 then reissued as a 12-inch LP with additional tracks in 1955.

Reception

The Allmusic site awarded the album 4 stars.

Track listing
All compositions by Stan Kenton except where noted.
 "Tampico" (Allan Roberts, Doris Fisher) – 2:37
 "Artistry in Boogie" (Pete Rugolo, Stan Kenton) – 3:00
 "Southern Scandal" – 3:07
 "Machito" (Rugolo) – 2:27
 "After You" (Seger Ellis) – 3:01 Additional track on 12-inch LP
 "Harlem Holiday" – 2:34 Additional track on 12-inch LP
 "And Her Tears Flowed Like Wine" (Kenton, Charles Lawrence, Joe Greene) – 3:08
 "Minor Riff" (Rugolo, Kenton) – 3:07
 "Across the Alley from the Alamo" (Greene) – 2:38
 "Unison Riff" (Rugolo) – 3:12
 "There Is No Greater Love" (Isham Jones, Marty Symes) – 3:04 Additional track on 12-inch LP
 "How High The Moon" (Morgan Lewis, Nancy Hamilton) – 2:30 Additional track on 12-inch LP

Recorded at C.P. MacGregor Studios in Hollywood, California on May 20, 1944 (track 7), Universal Recording Studios, Chicago, Illinois on May 4, 1945 (tracks 1 & 3), at Radio Recorders in Hollywood, California on June 4, 1946 (track 2), February 13, 1947 (track 4) February 28, 1947 (tracks 9 & 11) March 31, 1947 (track 8) and October 22, 1947 (track 10), at RKO-Pathé Studios, New York City on January 2, 1947 (track 5), December 21, 1947 (track 12) and December 22, 1947 (track 6).

Personnel
Stan Kenton – piano, conductor
Alfred "Chico" Alvarez (tracks 2, 4–6 & 8–12), John Anderson (tracks 1–5, 8, 9 & 11), John Carroll (tracks 1, 3 & 7), Buddy Childers, Karl George (track 7), Mel Green (tracks 1 & 3), Ken Hanna (tracks 2, 4–6 & 8–12), Dick Morse (track 7), Al Porcino (tracks 6, 10 & 12), Gene Roland (tracks 1 & 3), Ray Wetzel (tracks 2, 4–6 & 8–12) – trumpet 
Bill Atkinson (track 7), Milt Bernhart (tracks 4–6 & 8–12), Eddie Bert (tracks 6, 10 & 12), Harry Betts (tracks 6, 10 & 12), George Faye (track 7), Harry Forbes (tracks 4–12), Milt Kabak (tracks 1–3), Skip Layton (tracks 4, 5, 8, 9 & 11), Marshall Ocker (tracks 1 & 3), Miff Sines (track 2), Kai Winding (tracks 2–5, 8, 9 & 11), Freddie Zito (tracks 1 & 3) – trombone 
Bart Varsalona – bass trombone
Al Anthony (track 2), Chester Ball (track 7), Eddie Meyers (tracks 4, 5, 7–9 & 11), Bob Lively (tracks 1 & 3), Boots Mussulli (tracks 1–5, 8, 9 & 11), Art Pepper (tracks 6 & 10), George Weidler (tracks 6 & 10) – alto saxophone 
Bob Cooper (tracks 2, 4–6 & 8–12), Red Dorris (track 5), Stan Getz (track 7), Dave Madden (tracks 1 & 3), Joe Magro (tracks 1 & 3), Dave Matthews (track 7), Vido Musso (tracks 2, 4, 8, 9 & 11), Warner Weidler (tracks 6, 10 & 12) – tenor saxophone
Maurice Beeson (track 7), Bob Gioga (tracks 1–6 & 8–12) – baritone saxophone 
Bob Ahern (tracks 1–5, 7–9 & 11), Laurindo Almeida (tracks 6, 10 & 12) – guitar 
Pete Rugolo – piano (track 2)
Gene Englund (track 7), Eddie Safranski (tracks 2, 4–6 & 8–12), Max Wayne (tracks 1 & 3) – bass 
Shelly Manne (tracks 2, 4–6 & 8–12), Jesse Price (track 7), Bob Varney (tracks 1 & 3) – drums
Jack Costanzo – bongos (tracks 6, 10 & 12)
June Christy (tracks 1, 9 & 12), Anita O'Day (track 7) – vocals
The Pastels – vocal group (tracks 5 & 11)
Margaret Dale
Dave Lambert
Wayne Howard
Jerry Packer
Jerry Duane
Buddy Baker (track 7), Stan Kenton (tracks 3, 6), Gene Roland (track 1), Pete Rugolo (tracks 2, 4, 5, 8–12) – arranger

References

Stan Kenton albums
1952 albums
Capitol Records albums
Albums arranged by Pete Rugolo
Albums conducted by Stan Kenton